A constitutional referendum was held in Haiti on 23 July 1939. The changes abolished the direct election of the President and referendums as President Sténio Vincent considered them a "waste of time". The proposals were approved a reported 99.9% of voters, and put into effect by Parliament on 8 August.

Results

References

1939 in Haiti
1939 referendums
Initiatives and referendums in Haiti
Constitutional referendums in Haiti
July 1939 events